Chris Docherty (born 14 November 1976 in Scotland) is a Scottish former rugby union player who played for Glasgow Warriors at the Hooker position.

He played once in the Heineken Cup for Glasgow, in the season 1997-98 against Leicester Tigers, coming off the bench. Glasgow lost the match 90 - 19 in the Quarter Final play-off.

He was announced in Glasgow's Heineken Cup squad of 2001 - 02.

The Hooker started out his amateur career with Glasgow High Kelvinside. On GHK merge with Glasgow Academicals in 1997 to form the Glasgow Hawks; he played for the new club.

Docherty played for the amateur club side Glasgow Hawks and captained them in season 2001 - 02.

He moved into coaching for one season at Hawks, before moving to coach Cartha Queens Park RFC.

External links 
 EPCR Profile

References

1976 births
Living people
Glasgow Hawks players
Glasgow High Kelvinside RFC players
Glasgow Warriors players
Place of birth missing (living people)
Scottish rugby union players
Rugby union hookers